The Biggest Wave is the second album released by surf music band The Surfin' Lungs, released in September 1987 on Satellite Records' Beat International label. Similar in style to Cowabunga, The Biggest Wave featured a collection of surf/summer-inspired tunes with all 12 songs self-penned by the group. The album was self-produced by the group, but a failure by Beat International to promote the album saw fail to attract the attention it should have.

Track listing 
 Quarter Mile Machine (Pearce) – Lead vocals: Chris Pearce
 Waiting for Summer Vacation (Pearce, Dean) – Lead vocals: Chris Pearce
 Girl Trouble (Pearce) – Lead vocals: Chris Pearce
 The Day They Towed My Chevy Away (Pearce, Dean) – Lead vocals: Chris Pearce
 Gunfight At Waikiki Beach (Dean, Knipe) – Instrumental
 Don't Face That Wave (Pearce) – Lead vocals: Chris Pearce
 Jimmy's Pad (Pearce) – Lead vocals: Chris Pearce
 Her Dad's A Jerk (Pearce, Dean) – Lead vocals: Chris Pearce
 Goodbye To High School (Pearce) – Lead vocals: Chris Pearce
 Volleyball King (Pearce, Dean) – Lead vocals: Chris Pearce
 I Wish That Woody Was Mine (Pearce, Dean, Knipe) – Lead vocals: Chris Pearce
 That Special Summer (Pearce) – Lead vocals: Chris Pearce

Personnel 
 Chris Pearce – vocals, guitar
 Geoffo Knipe – guitar, farfisa organ
 Steve Dean – vocals, bass
 Al Beckett – drums, vocals

Trivia 
 These were the final Lungs recordings to feature founding member Geoffo Knipe, with the keyboardist leaving shortly after completion of the album and just before the release, to be replaced by Clive Gilling.
 This was also the final album that drummer Al Beckett appeared on, although he stayed with the group for another year until being replaced by Graeme Block.
 Geoffo Knipe never sang on any of the band's records.

1987 albums
The Surfin' Lungs albums